Anuj (Devanagari: अनुज) is a male first name of Sanskrit origin. Anuj is a common Indian name meaning "younger brother".

Notable people with the name include:
 Anuj, Indian-born Australian pop singer
 Anuj Dass (born 1974), Indian cricketer
 Anuj Dhar, Indian author and journalist
 Anuj Gurwara (born 1981), Indian playback singer, Radio Jockey, actor and MC
 Anuj Lugun (born 1986), Indian award winner poet
 Anuj Nayyar (born 1975), Indian Army Officer
 Anuj Rastogi (born 1978), Canadian composer
 Anuj Sachdeva (born 1982), Indian actor
 Anuj Sawhney (born 1981), Indian actor
 Anuj Saxena (born 1957), Indian actor
 Anuj Sharma, a singer who became famous through Indian Idol

References 

Indian masculine given names